The grey cutthroat eel, Synaphobranchus affinis, is a cutthroat eel. It was originally described by Albert Günther in 1877. It lives a benthic lifestyle, inhabiting the continental slope and global deep waters including near Portugal, Canary Islands, Morocco, Japan, Australia, and others.  It is a marine, deep water-dwelling eel which has been found at depths ranging from 300 to 2300 meters (1000 to 7500 ft) and at temperatures ranging from 3.3 - 11.3° C . Males can grow to a length of up to 110 centimeters (43 in).  It is primarily a scavenger, however it also actively hunts small fish and crustaceans.

The grey cutthroat eel (Synaphobranchus affinis) is commonly mistaken with Kaup's arrowtooth eel (Synaphobranchus kaupii) due to their morphological similarities. The primary method of differentiation between the two is by analyzing vertebral count, dorsal fin rays, and anal fin rays.

References 
 Froese, Rainer and Pauly, Daniel, eds. (2011). "Synaphobranchus affinis" in FishBase. June 2011 version.

Synaphobranchidae
Fish described in 1877
Taxa named by Albert Günther